Once More is the fourth studio album of Colonial Cousins, an Indian band formed by Indian duo composed of singer Hariharan and singer-composer Lesle Lewis. It was released on October 29, 2012 under the label Universal.

Reception
Hariharan and Lesle Lewis known together as the Colonial Cousins are back after more than a decade to enthrall their legion of fans.

Since the inception of Colonial Cousins in 1996, they have enjoyed massive popularity and their unique blend of traditional and contemporary music won over the hearts of audiences all over the country. The two have had three successful career albums, with their last work in 2001 with the release of 'Aatma' post which they went on to explore and flourish in their own individual careers.

Now, 11 years later, they have come together to release their brand new album Colonial Cousins 'Once More' In a first of its kind event, to launch their latest album, the duo took to the jostling promenade of Carter Road in the busy suburb of Bandra, Mumbai, in a musical ensemble that worked its way from Otters Club to the amphitheater, all along performing music from their new album on top of a 40-foot canter. The performance brought out fans galore from all around who came to watch the legends. The event concluded with the official unveiling of album Colonial Cousins 'Once More'.

Track listing
From in.com.

References

External links
 COLONIAL COUSINS ONCE MORE
 Colonial Cousins launches new album 'Once More' after a decade

2012 albums
Colonial Cousins albums